Melese rubricata is a moth of the family Erebidae. It was described by Paul Dognin in 1910. It is found in French Guiana.

References

 

Melese
Moths described in 1910